Campolattaro is a comune (municipality) of 995 inhabitants in the Province of Benevento in the Italian region of Campania, located about  northeast of Naples and about 20 kilometers north of Benevento, its Provincial Capital. Bordering the municipalities of Casalduni, Circello, Fragneto l'Abate, Fragneto Monforte, Morcone, and Pontelandolfo, Campolattaro is part of the historic region of Samnium. 
 
Placed north of Mount Sauco (572 m) near the Tammaro River, it has an altitude between 322 m and 572 m above sea level.

The town, developed in medieval times, attracts the visitor for its particular urban structure divided into three parts: the upper part; the town piazza near the castle; and the ancient borgo. The upper part of the town, located at the top of the hill, is characterized by a series of steep alleys leading down to the town piazza at the base of the castle. Further down is the century-old borgo, which includes the old parish church.

In an area of the municipal territory, a reservoir called "Lago di Campolattaro" is home to the Oasis of Campolattaro, a wildlife protected area which is placed along the migratory course of many types of birds that can easily be seen in spring and autumn. Flora, fauna, and especially birdlife are extremely varied: white storks, cranes, ashy herons, great crested grebes, little egrets, bee-eaters, lesser grey shrikes, and herons, cormorants, and wood pigeons build their nests or spend the winter in this splendid Oasis.

On steep slopes, immediately outside the walls of the town, stands the Botanical Garden of Sannio. This is an area dedicated to exploring, rediscovering, and preserving the biodiversity of native and rare species found nowhere else, which are heavily threatened by habitat loss and human activities: hundreds of varieties of ancient fruits, rare plants, and wild medicinal herbs; among these, two very ancient types of fruits have been rescued and reintroduced: the Limoncella Apple, indigenous to Sannio, as it has been present since the Samnite period, and the S. Giovanni Pear, a breed of pomes already nurtured in Roman times. This flora is essential for the environment in attracting the insects needed to build a food chain and turn a garden into a valued biodiversity hotspot.

History
Driving from Benevento along the highway that leads to Campobasso, is a junction to the town of Campolattaro. The town is in an elevated position on the right bank of the river Tammaro.

Archaeological finds attest the presence of ancient settlements since the Roman age, but reliable and documented information dates the presence of the town back to around the year 1100 in the Norman period.

The presence of numerous archaeological findings suggests that the current municipal territory has been inhabited since the fifth century BC by the Samnites and, later, by the Romans. The settlement of the Apuan Ligurians deported in 180 B.C. in the areas of the Alto Tammaro by the consuls Bebio and Cornelio undoubtedly involved also Campolattaro, as evidenced by the apotropaic signs of the sun and moon sculptured on the portals of the town's old houses—elements that recall similar motifs found in the areas of Versilia and Val di Magra—evidence of an indisputable common lineage.

Probably appearing in the early Middle Ages, the first nucleus of today's inhabited area was devastated by the Saracens during the 9th century.

The first mention of Campolattaro can be found in documents dating back from the 12th century. In the "Chronicon de rebus aetate sua gestis" [Chronicle of Southern Italy in the Norman period] (1138)" written by the Lombard historian Falco of Benevento, the town was called "Campugattari," while in the Catalog of the Barons it is mentioned under the name "Campugactarum."

Within the town, however, especially among the elderly, there is a widespread tale (seemingly with no official evidence) that the name derives from “Campus Lotarii” because in that area were allegedly encamped, in the Year 848, the troops sent by Lothair, a Holy Roman Emperor (817–855) to free Benevento from the Saracens.

In 1138 the town was burned down by Roger the Norman because it was among the towns that rebelled against the royal power. In that year Campolattaro was a fiefdom of Goffredo, Baron of Buonalbergo. Under the Aragonese dynasty, it became a feud of the Di Capua Family, who held the Campolattaro fiefdom until the 17th century, when it was sold to Michael Blanch, Marquis of San Giovanni, for 8,000 Ducats. In the 18th century the Blanch Family transferred the fiefdom of Campolattaro to the Capomazza Family, who in 1813 sold it for 10,000 Ducats to Giovanni De Agostini, whose descendants are still owners of the Castle. 
 
The town was struck by the plague of 1656, by the famine of 1764, and by the cholera of 1837. After many vicissitudes the town, which previously belonged to the Pontelandolfo district of the Province of Molise, was annexed to the Kingdom of Italy and in 1861 became part of the newborn Province of Benevento, following an administrative path shared with almost all the other municipalities of today's Comunità Montana. The town, despite its troubled history, started to flourish again in the second half of the 19th century.

Culture
The patron saint of Campolattaro is St. Sebastian, for whom the town church is named.

A visit is also worthwhile in the center of the old borgo to the church of SS. Salvatore, featuring a baroque style facade, three stone portals, and a central window. Dating back to the 18th century, it has a high bell tower on four levels. The inner part has three aisles with several statues.

The popular dish  originated in the municipality.  It was conceived by and a favorite of the Marquis of Campolattaro in the 14th century.

Campolattaro houses a Centro Culturale per lo Studio della Civiltà Contadina del Sannio (Cultural Center for the Study of the Rural Life in the Sannio area) offering a rich library specializing in local history texts.

Campolattaro Castle was built in the 13th century around a massive tower constructed by the Normans probably between the 11th and 12th century. It served as the town fortress and military overlook during times of attack through the centuries. Under the Aragonese domination, it was adorned with round towers and crenellations. Over the centuries it lost its original defense function, becoming a residence for the feudal lords. Presently owned by the De Agostini family, it is now a tourist attraction. It can be visited by reservation.

The architecture is rectangular and it is built around a large central courtyard lined on the sides by the Castle's internal walls and by a Palatine Chapel. The latter dates back to the 16th century, but it was re-consecrated in 1717 by the Archbishop of Benevento Cardinal Vincenzo Maria Orsini (later Pope Benedict XIII.) He had previously visited Campolattaro to consecrate the Madonna del Canale Chapel (1703).
 
Of particular interest is the "Trappeto", an oil mill dating back to the seventeenth century, earlier used as a stable (still visible the horse mangers), the reception hall, and the Norman tower.

In this ancient building there are visible engravings of Templar symbols testifying the presence of Knights in the Castle, such as the carvings depicting crosses and symbols typical of the Order of Knights Templar, especially those depicting the Triplice Cinta (Triple Enclosure) consisting of three concentric squares connected by central lines. Two of these TC depictions are still observable today on the steps of an internal staircase, one just sketched and one very well defined. The Castle is treasuring also a suggestive Investiture Hall, where the Templar Initiation Ceremonies were held.

Completely unique and of great historical interest is the Tabula Alimentaria Bebiana, which was found in the near town of Circello, but was kept in the De Agostini Castle of Campolattaro until 1875, when it was sold to the Italian State and transferred to Rome at the Museo Kircheriano, and later at the National Roman Museum - Diocletian's Thermal Baths. This Tabula Alimentaria Bebiana is one of the few testimonies of the Institutio alimentaria—the fruit of a decision taken in 103 AD by Emperor Trajan in favor of the needy children of Roman Italy. It was a loan of money, backed by a mortgage and granted to small landowners in order to discourage the depopulation of the countryside during  economic and demographic crises. The measure was also aimed at achieving a further objective: donating the interest paid by the borrowers to needy children. This is why in one of the panels of the Benevento triumphal arch, the Emperor Trajan appears surrounded by children.

Notable people
 - cartographer and academic

Tourism
Tourist sites include:

The Castle (Castello Mediotemplare) (10th-11th centuries)
Church of Madonna del Canale
Church of San Sebastiano
Church of the Most Holy Savior, also known as the "Mother Church"
Palatine Chapel, the oldest church in town, facing the courtyard of the Marquisal Templar Castle, was built in 16th century and opens onto the inner courtyard of the same castle. It was reconsecrated and dedicated to St. Martin in 1717 by Cardinal Vincenzo Maria Orsini (later Pope Benedict XIII) 
Lago di Campolattaro
Orto Botanico del Sannio “OrtAntico” (Botanical Garden of Sannio)

Local Administrative Area
Campolattaro is part of the:
 Comunità Montana Zona Alto Tammaro (Highland Community of the Upper Tammaro River Area)
 Agrarian Region # 4 – Colline del Calore Irpino inferiore (Hills of the Lower Calore River Area of Irpinia)

Diaspora
Many residents emigrated to the United States in the late 19th century and early 1900s. They predominantly settled in industrial areas such as Bellaire, Ohio; Waterbury, Connecticut; Koppel, Pennsylvania; and Philadelphia, as well as other Rust Belt areas in eastern Ohio and western Pennsylvania. Names such as Massa, DiBlasio and Iadanza are common surnames from Campolattaro which emigrated to these sectors of the US.

Later emigrants settled in Argentina, Brazil, Canada and Australia in the early 20th century.

References

Cities and towns in Campania